LD + 3 is an album by jazz saxophonist Lou Donaldson and The Three Sounds recorded for the Blue Note label and performed by Donaldson with Gene Harris, Andrew Simpkins, and Bill Dowdy.

Reception

The album was awarded 4½ stars by Stephen Thomas Erlewine in an Allmusic review which stated "Donaldson is at a fiery peak, spinning out Bird-influenced licks that nevertheless illustrate that he's developed a more rounded, individual style of his own. The Three Sounds are equally as impressive, working bop rhythms with a dexterity that their first albums only hinted at. That high standard is maintained throughout the album, one of the finest in either of their catalogs. Albums like this and Blues Walk established Donaldson's reputation as a first-rate alto saxophonist, since he flaunts a full, robust tone, a fondness for melody, and nimble solos over the course of the record. LD + 3 is pretty much straight bop and hard bop, with little of the soul-jazz the two artists would later explore, but this collection of swinging standards, bop staples, and a pair of Donaldson originals ranks as one of Lou's finest straight bop sessions".

Track listing
All compositions by Lou Donaldson except as indicated

 "Three Little Words" (Bert Kalmar, Harry Ruby) - 6:20
 "Smooth Groove" - 5:51
 "Just Friends" (John Klenner, Lewis) - 5:11
 "Blue Moon" (Hart, Rodgers) - 3:04
 "Jump Up" - 6:33
 "Don't Take Your Love from Me" (Henry Nemo) - 5:50
 "Confirmation" (Parker) - 5:33

Personnel
Lou Donaldson - alto saxophone
Gene Harris - piano
Andrew Simpkins - bass
Bill Dowdy - drums

Production
 Alfred Lion - producer
 Reid Miles - design
 Rudy Van Gelder - engineer
 Francis Wolff - photography

References

Lou Donaldson albums
The Three Sounds albums
1959 albums
Blue Note Records albums
Albums produced by Alfred Lion
Albums recorded at Van Gelder Studio